Baade may refer to:
 Baade (crater), a lunar impact crater
 Baade 152, the first German jet passenger airliner
 One of the Magellan telescopes at Las Campanas Observatory in Chile
 Baade (surname), list of people with this name

See also
 1501 Baade, asteroid
 Baade's Window, an area of sky important for astronomical observations 
 Vallis Baade, a valley on the Moon